Her Resale Value is a 1933 American pre-Code drama film directed by B. Reeves Eason and starring June Clyde, George J. Lewis and Noel Francis. The film's sets were designed by the art director Paul Palmentola.

Bored of her life as a small town doctor's wife, a young woman heads to the city with ambitions of becoming a model. She takes a new lover and plans to divorce her husband, now a head of a hospital, so that she can remarry.

Cast
 June Clyde as Mary Harris 
 George J. Lewis as Dr. Ted Harris 
 Noel Francis as Milly 
 Ralf Harolde as Sidney Fletcher 
 Gladys Hulette as Jane Martin
 Crauford Kent as Dick Stevens
 Richard Tucker as Dr. Lukas
 Franklin Parker as Truex

References

Bibliography
 Michael R. Pitts. Poverty Row Studios, 1929–1940: An Illustrated History of 55 Independent Film Companies, with a Filmography for Each. McFarland & Company, 2005.

External links

1933 films
American drama films
American black-and-white films
1933 drama films
Films directed by B. Reeves Eason
Mayfair Pictures films
1930s English-language films
1930s American films